Falguni Pathak (born 12 March 1971) is an Indian singer, performing artist and composer based in Mumbai. Her music is based on traditional musical forms from the Indian state of Gujarat. Since her professional debut in 1987, she has developed into an artist with a large fan base across India. Once asked how she decided to take up singing as a career, she replied that it happened by default.

Her debut album was released in 1998, and she has also recorded numerous songs for Bollywood movies. The theme of most of her songs is love. She has performed in many shows in India and other countries, backed by a band called Tha Thaiyaa. She has made appearances in television shows like Taarak Mehta Ka Ooltah Chashmah, Kaun Banega Crorepati, Star Dandiya Dhoom, Comedy Nights With Kapil and Baa Bahoo Aur Baby.

She has some very popular Indian pop singles to her credit, still heard and appreciated all over India. Her albums are not only famous for the melodious songs but also for the cute love stories depicted with them. She is very popular with the Gujarati community where she is called to perform for popular festivals like Navaratri.

Some of her popular songs are Chudi Jo Khanki Haathon Mein, Maine Payal Hai Chhankai, Meri Chunar Udd Udd Jaye, Ayi Pardesh Se Pariyon Ki Rani and Sawaan Mein.

In August 2013, it was reported that she would make Rs 2 crore during the year's Navratri festivities. The singer was reportedly offered Rs 70 lakh for each day she sings and performs for an event management company. The organisers were planning to utilize her popularity by wooing sponsors.

Discography

Unofficial albums

Soundtracks

Religious music

References

External links
 

1964 births
Living people
Indian women playback singers
Indian women pop singers
Gujarati playback singers
21st-century Indian singers
Gujarati people
Indian women composers
21st-century Indian composers
Bollywood playback singers
21st-century Indian women singers
Women musicians from Maharashtra
Singers from Mumbai
21st-century women composers